Annette Curtis Klause (born June 20, 1953) is an English-American writer and librarian, specializing in young adult fiction. She is currently a children's materials selector for Montgomery County Public Libraries in Montgomery County, Maryland. Born in Bristol, England, she now lives in Hyattsville, Maryland with her husband Mark and their cats. She holds a Bachelor of Arts degree in English literature and a Master of Library Science degree from the University of Maryland, College Park.

Bibliography

Novels
The Silver Kiss (1990, Delacorte)
Alien Secrets (1993, Delacorte)
Blood and Chocolate (1997, Delacorte)
Freaks: Alive on the Inside (2006, Margaret K. McElderry)

Other publications
Klause contributed book reviews to the School Library Journal from 1982 through 1994.

References

External links

 
 

American librarians
American women librarians
American children's writers
American women novelists
1953 births
Living people
American horror writers
American science fiction writers
American women children's writers
Women science fiction and fantasy writers
Women horror writers
Writers from Bristol
People from Hyattsville, Maryland
English emigrants to the United States
20th-century American novelists
21st-century American novelists
20th-century American women writers
21st-century American women writers
University of Maryland, College Park alumni